The 1923 Giro di Lombardia was the 19th edition of the Giro di Lombardia cycle race and was held on 27 October 1923. The race started and finished in Milan. The race was won by Giovanni Brunero of the Legnano team.

General classification

References

1923
Giro di Lombardia
Giro di Lombardia